Robert Hefner may refer to:

 Robert A. Hefner (1874–1971), Oklahoma lawyer and mayor
 Robert A. Hefner Jr. (1907–?), his son, Oklahoma lawyer
 Robert W. Hefner, American academic